Mkrtich Mazmanian (born July 27, 1944 in Gyumri) is a well known Armenian figurative sculptor based in Beyrut, Lebanon.

Biography 
Mazmanian graduated from the Mercurov Art School in Gyumri and Terlemezian Art College in Yerevan. Later he continued his education at the National Higher Art Institute of Tallinn, Estonia and graduated with a Master's degree in Art/sculpting.

Since 1979 Mazmanian is a member of the Union of Artists of the Republic of Armenia and since 1990 member of International Association of Art, UNESCO.

In 1985 he was awarded with “The Republic of Armenia’s Medal”.

Mazmanian created number of monuments in different countries - Estonia, Latvia, Moldova, Armenia, Lebanon. He has held exhibitions in Middle East, Europe, Asia, and Russia.

Monumental Statues 
No Genocide, Rostov-on-Don, 2015
Sos Sargsyan, Yerevan, Armenia 2014
 Prime minister Joseph Skaff, Zahle, Lebanon, 2013
President Michel Suleiman, Beirut, Lebanon, 2012
Saeb Salam, Beirut, Lebanon, 2010
 Camille Chamoun, Del el Qamar, Lebanon, 2010
 Saint Jacob Haddad, Beirut, Lebanon, 2010
Prime Minister Raffic Hariri, Beirut, Lebanon, 2009
Martyr’s square, Lebanon, 2008
Saint Jacob Haddad with his students, Del-el Qamar, Lebanon, 2005
Saint. Mary , Der-el–Qamar, Lebanon, 2005
Heroes Monument, Shengavid, Armenia, 1991
Movses Korkissian, AsrthurKarapetian and their friends, Yerevan, Armenia, 1991
The monumental statue of Cardinal Sfeir, Rayfoun, Lebanon, 1999
Yerevan, International Zvartnots Airport, Yerevan, Armenia, 1980
Ornaments at the Youth Palace, Yerevan, Armenia, 1979
Obelisks that survived the earthquake in Leninakans airport and its main squares, Gyumri, Armenia, 1979

Exhibitions

Art Expo New York, New York, USA, 2018
Art Palm Beach, West Palm Beach, Florida, USA, 2018
Red Dot Miami, Miami Florida, USA 2017
Art fair (ME.NA.SA.ART), Beirut Lebanon, 2017
New York ArtExpo, PIER 94, New York, US, 2017
Solo Exhibition, Yerevan Armenia, 2016
Corps en flamme, Paris France, GALERIE KO21, 2014
L'Espace Pierre Cardin, Paris France, 2014
"Scope Art Basel", Basel, Switzerland, 2014
Carrousell Du Louvre, Paris, France, 2014
Art Monaco, Monte Carlo, France, 2014
Hivernales De Paris, Paris, France, 2012
Beirut Art Fair [ME.NA.SA.ART], Beirut, Lebanon, 2012
Le Grey Hotel (Esquisse Gallery), Beirut, Lebanon, 2012
Ministry of Tourism (Esquisse Gallery), Beirut, Lebanon, 2011
Art Center Manama, Bahrain, 2010
Museum of Cilicia (Permanent exhibit), Antelias, Lebanon
ARTUEL, Beirut, Lebanon, 1996-2003
Museum of Sursock, Beirut, Lebanon, 1997-2008
Euro Art Geneva, Switzerland, 2001
EUROPART, Fiera Internationale del’Arte, Geneva, Switzerland, 2000
Riviera, Beirut, Lebanon, 1998
La Cigale, Beirut, Lebanon, 1995
Gulbenkian Centre, Beirut, Lebanon, 1992
Art Centre of Painters, Yerevan, Armenia, 1979
Art Salon, Tallinn, Estonia, 1977
Opera Exhibition Hall Tallinn, Estonia, 1977

Quotes 
"For me, the woman or the mother does everything,” he says. “They are more productive than men. If the woman disappears from the world there won’t be any progress".

"I prefer monumental sculptures. I like to have a balance between monumental sculptures and architecture ... In education you study the history of art from the Greeks, the Egyptians, and you always dream of doing big sculpture like the pharaohs, the pyramids – anything related to buildings and architecture".

References

External links
Mkrtich MAZMANIAN (1944)

1944 births
Armenian sculptors
Living people
People from Gyumri